Jesmond Dene House is a 19th-century mansion house at Jesmond Dene, Newcastle upon Tyne, England which is now a hotel. It is a Grade II listed building.

History
The house, which was designed by John Dobson for Thomas Emerson Headlam, a physician and Mayor of Newcastle, was completed in 1822. This was not the home of Lord Armstrong, a wealthy industrialist, whose nearby house has been demolished, though its Banqueting Hall survives. However Armstrong did landscape and develop the adjacent Jesmond Dene into a woodland park and garden.

In 1851, Dobson made substantial changes to the house for its new owner, William Cruddas. In 1871 the house was bought by Armstrong's business partner Andrew Noble. At this time Noble had architect Norman Shaw make significant alterations to the house. In 1897, Noble carried out further extensive alterations and extensions to the house, with the assistance of architect Frank West Rich, including a new west wing, a great hall and a Gothic-style porch.

Following the death of Noble's widow in 1929 the house was put to various uses, including a college, a civil defence establishment, a seminary and a residential school. Following an extensive restoration and refurbishment in 2005, Jesmond Dene House became a 40-bedroom boutique hotel with a three-rosette restaurant.

Notes

References

Grade II listed buildings in Tyne and Wear
Buildings and structures in Newcastle upon Tyne
1822 establishments in England